His First Command is a 1929 American pre-Code comedy action film directed by Gregory La Cava and starring William Boyd, Dorothy Sebastian and Gavin Gordon. Location shooting took place at Fort Riley in Kansas.

Synopsis
A playboy falls in love with the daughter of the commandant of an American post. He enlists in order to be close to her, but soon finds that his manners irritate the other soldiers.

Cast
 William Boyd as Terry Culver
 Dorothy Sebastian as Judy Gaylord
 Gavin Gordon as Lt. Freddie Allen
 Helen Parrish as Jane Sargent
 Alphonse Ethier as Col. Gaylord
 Howard Hickman as Maj. Hall
 Paul Hurst as Sgt. Westbrook
 Jules Cowles as Cpl. Jones
 Rose Tapley as Mrs. Pike
 Mabel Van Buren as Mrs. Sargent
 Charles R. Moore as Homer

References

Bibliography
 Munden, Kenneth White. The American Film Institute Catalog of Motion Pictures Produced in the United States, Part 1. University of California Press, 1997.

External links
 

1929 films
1929 comedy films
1920s English-language films
American comedy films
Films directed by Gregory La Cava
Pathé Exchange films
Films shot in Kansas
1920s American films